The 2019 AFL Tasmania TSL premiership season is an Australian rules football competition staged across Tasmania, Australia over twenty-one home and away rounds and six finals series matches between 30 March and 21 September.

The League was known as the Bupa TSL under a commercial naming-rights sponsorship agreement with the company.

Participating clubs
Clarence District Football Club
Glenorchy District Football Club
Lauderdale Football Club
Launceston Football Club
North Hobart Football Club
North Launceston Football Club
Tigers Football Club

2019 TSL coaches
Jeromey Webberley (Clarence)
Paul Kennedy (Glenorchy)
Darren Winter (Lauderdale)
Mitch Thorp (Launceston)
Richard Robinson (North Hobart)
Taylor Whitford (North Launceston)
Trent Baumeler (Tigers FC)

Awards
 Alastair Lynch Medal (Best afield throughout season): Josh Ponting (North Launceston) 
 RACT Insurance Player of the Year (Best player voted by the media): Daniel Joseph (Glenorchy) and Taylor Whitford (North Launceston)
 Matthew Richardson Medal (Rookie of the Year): Sherrin Egger (North Launceston)
 Baldock Medal (Grand Final Best on Ground): Bradley Cox-Goodyer (North Launceston) 
 Cazaly Medal (Premiership Coach in TSL): Taylor Whitford (North Launceston) 
 Hudson Medal (Highest goal kicker in TSL season): Mitch Thorp (Launceston) 62 Goals

2019 TSL leading goalkickers
Bradley Cox-Goodyer (North Launceston) - 51
Aiden Grace (Glenorchy) - 50 
Colin Garland (North Hobart) - 42
Mitch Thorp (Launceston) - 41

Highest Individual Goalkickers In a Match
 8 – Jaye Bowden (Glenorchy) v (Clarence) – 31 May 2019 at KGV Oval
 8 – Colin Garland (North Hobart) v (Clarence) – 6 July 2019 at North Hobart Oval
 7 – Colin Garland (North Hobart) v (North Launceston) – 11 May 2019 at UTAS Stadium
 7 – Mitch Thorp (Launceston) v (Lauderdale) – 20 May 2019 at Windsor Park

Premiership season
Source:

Round 1

Round 2

Round 3

Round 4

Round 5

Round 6

Round 7

Round 8

Round 9

Round 10

Round 11

Round 12

Round 13

Round 14

Round 15

Round 16

Round 17

Round 18

Round 19

Round 20

Round 21

Ladder

Season records

Highest club scores
 22.8. (140) – Glenorchy v Clarence 31 May 2019 at KGV Oval
 20.16. (136) - North Launceston v Clarence 25 May 2019 at Blundstone Arena
 20.16. (136) – North Launceston v Tigers FC 18 May 2019 at UTAS Stadium

Lowest club scores
 2.3. (15) – North Hobart v North Launceston 15.16. (106) – 22 June 2019 at North Hobart Oval
 3.5. (23) – Lauderdale v North Launceston 9.14. (68) – 10 August 2019 at Lauderdale Oval
 3.5. (23) – Tigers FC v North Launceston 20.16. (136) – 18 May 2019 at UTAS Stadium

TSL Team Of The Year

TSL Finals Series

Elimination Final

Qualifying Final

1st Semi-Final

2nd Semi-Final

Preliminary Final

Grand Final

References

External links
 Tasmanian State League Website
 AFL Tasmania

2019
2019 in Australian rules football